PNB MetLife India Insurance Company Limited (PNB MetLife) established in 2001 is one of the leading life insurance companies in India. PNB MetLife shareholders include MetLife International Holdings LLC (MIHL), Punjab National Bank (PNB), Jammu & Kashmir Bank Limited (JKB), and M. Pallonji and Company Private Limited, as well as other private investors. MIHL and PNB are the majority shareholders in the company. The company serves customers in over 7000 locations providing a range of health, life and retirement insurance products.

History 
PNB MetLife was initially launched as MetLife India Insurance Company Limited in 2001. In 2011, PNB acquired a 30% stake in MetLife India Insurance. On 7 December 2012, PNB and MetLife India approached the Competition Commission of India (CCI). In January 2013, PNB received full approval to purchase a 30% stake in MetLife India Insurance. This new private sector life insurer was re-branded as PNB MetLife India Ltd.

PNB MetLife now has over 150 branches across the country and serves customers at more than 7,000 locations through its bank partnerships with PNB, Jammu and Kashmir Bank Limited (JKB), and Karnataka Bank Limited.

Key people 
The key people of PNB MetLife India Insurance Company Limited as defined by Insurance Regulatory and Development Authority of India (IRDA) are as follows:

Products and services 
Some key plans include:

 PNB MetLife - Mera Term Plan Plus - Term Plan
 PNB MetLife - Mera Guaranteed Future Plan 
 PNB MetLife - Century Plan 
 PNB MetLife - Goal Ensuring Multiplier  
 PNB MetLife - Guaranteed Goal Plan
 PNB MetLife - Super Saver Plan
 PNB MetLife - Immediate Annuity Plan
 PNB MetLife - Grand Assured Income Plan

Awards 
2016:	PNB MetLife won the ‘Website of the Year’ award at the E-Commerce Summit & Awards in Mumbai.

2016:	PNB MetLife won ‘Celent Model Insurer Asia’ award for the most responsive eCommerce platform on a mobile.

2016:	PNB MetLife won honors at the prestigious Asia Training & Development Excellence Awards 2016 held in Singapore in two categories – Best Education Training Campaigns and Programs and Best Sales Development Program.

Other achievements 
In August 2014, the company launched its corporate social responsibility program to support the education of children in Karnataka. The project, which is part of the existing Rajiv Gandhi Crèche Scheme, supports the government's priority of strengthening and supporting the 30 crèche centers.

On the occasion of World Health Day, PNB MetLife announced the fifth edition of Guinness Record-holding PNB MetLife Satara Hill Half Marathon 2016.

A new digital campaign, including a 75-second film conceptualized by McCann Erickson, was launched by PNB MetLife in June 2016

References 

 Life insurance companies of India
 Financial services companies based in Mumbai
 MetLife
Punjab National Bank
2001 establishments in Maharashtra
Financial services companies established in 2001
Indian companies established in 2001